The Bridge of Weir Railway was an independent railway company that built a line from Johnstone to Bridge of Weir. It was taken over by the Glasgow and South Western Railway (G&SWR) in 1865 and formed the base of a line that extended to Greenock, giving the G&SWR access to the harbour facilities there, competing with the rival Caledonian Railway.

The Greenock branch, as it had become, was given a direct access from Elderslie (about midway between Paisley and Johnstone), and fast passenger trains ran between Glasgow and Greenock.

In the second half of the twentieth century usage of the line declined substantially, and the line closed in January 1983.

Formation 
By the 1860s the Glasgow and South Western Railway (G&SWR) had established itself in the south-western quadrant of Scotland, while the rival Caledonian Railway was dominant in the central region, with an important branch line to Greenock. There was bitter rivalry between the two companies, and each sought to retain primacy in its own area.

In September 1861 local interests approached the G&SWR, hoping for support for a scheme to build a branch railway to Bridge of Weir, but the G&SWR rebuffed them, as its priorities lay elsewhere at the time. Undeterred the local promoters formed a provisional scheme to build from Johnstone to Bridge of Weir, and possibly later to Kilmacolm; capital was estimated at £25,000. Now the G&SWR agreed to subscribe £8,000 to the proposal, fearing that if they did not, the Caledonian Railway would. Working arrangements were finalised on 26 March 1862: the G&SWR would work the line for 42.5% of gross revenue.

Conceived only as a branch line, the proposed route curved into Johnstone station facing away from Glasgow. There was a goods and mineral branch to Linwood, then a centre of industry, joining the main line by means of a backshunt.

The Bridge of Weir Railway was authorised by Act of Parliament on 7 July 1862. At this time money was hard to come by, but the new Company was able to let a construction contract to George Hunter for £15,931.

The line opened to goods trains on 25 April 1864, and to passengers on 20 June 1864. The company was now short of cash and the G&SWR agreed to defer its charges for working the line for five years at 5% interest—in effect a substantial loan.

Absorption, and extending to Greenock
The Caledonian Railway had a monopoly of the lucrative rail traffic to Greenock, and the G&SWR were interested in competing. Discussions took place in October 1864, which crystallised in a proposed Greenock and Ayrshire Railway, which would extend from Bridge of Weir. The G&SWR was to contribute £150,000 to such a scheme.

The Bridge of Weir line had always been worked by the G&SWR and by the G&SWR Amalgamation Act of 5 July 1865, the Bridge of Weir Railway company was vested in the G&SWR.

The G&SWR wished to proceed with the line to Greenock, and needed to upgrade and widen the Bridge of Weir line; to carry out the work it closed the line from 18 May 1868. It reopened on 30 August 1869 for goods traffic, together with the curve from Elderslie to Cart Junction, enabling direct running between Glasgow and the Greenock direction. At about the same time the extension to Greenock opened too. Passenger operation on the line started on 23 December 1869. The Greenock station was named Albert Dock, but the Princes Pier was built by the Greenock Harbour Trust, and when that was ready the Greenock station was renamed .

The G&SWR developed passenger traffic to resorts in the Firth of Clyde, as well as goods traffic from Greenock trans-shipped to coastal vessels. A significant business also developed in the emigration trade.

Topography
The line was short; the passenger stations were:

 Windyhill; opened after the end of the independent existence of the BoWR on 3 April 1871; renamed Crosslee May 1871; renamed Houston 1 January 1874; renamed Houston (Crosslee) 1 January 1875; renamed Houston 7 May 1973; closed 10 January 1983;
 Tweeniehills;
 Bridge of Weir; the station was closed on 18 May 1868 for the upgrading work in connection with the extension to Greenock; when the line re-opened the station on the Greenock and Ayrshire line opened, on 23 December 1869; it closed on 10 January 1983.

Rationalisation
In the 1950s British Railways determined that having two competing routes to Greenock was unsustainable, and passenger trains ceased running beyond Kilmacolm in February 1959. The line closed completely to passengers in January 1983.

References

Sources 
 
 
 
 The Glasgow & South Western Railway Association

Glasgow and South Western Railway
Pre-grouping British railway companies
Transport in Glasgow
Closed railway lines in Scotland
Railway lines opened in 1864
Johnstone